Comoros–Turkey relations are the foreign relations between the Comoros and Turkey.
Diplomatic relations at the rank of ambassador were established in 1979. 

The Embassy of the Comoros in Cairo, Egypt is accredited to Turkey. The Turkish ambassador in Antananarivo, Madagascar is accredited to the Comoros. The Comoros and Turkey maintain Honorary Consulates in Istanbul and Moroni respectively.

Diplomatic relations 
In the early 1990s, Comoran relations with South Africa diminished in importance because — following the abolishment of the apartheid regime — South Africa no longer needed friendly relations with the Comoros as evidence of its ability to enjoy good relations with a black African state.

As a response, the Comoros developed relations with other countries. Comoran relations with Turkey are significant because Turkey is the third largest provider of aid, consisting of development funding for updating the fisheries infrastructure and building highways.

Economic relations 
 Trade volume between the two countries was 21.1 million USD in 2019.
 Turkey provides development and technical assistance to the Comoros through its TIKA coordination office in Moroni.

Educational relations  
 The two countries signed an educational agreement that allows junior diplomats from the Comoros to get trained in Turkey.
 Turkey provided Türkiye Scholarships, which provides funding for undergraduate degrees in Turkey, to 127 students from the Comoros.

See also 

 Foreign relations of Comoros
 Foreign relations of Turkey

References

Further reading 
 Baum, Dan. "The Comoros Connection," Africa Report, 34, No. 1, January-February 1989, p. 49.Bouvet, Henri. Les problèmes deformation aux Comores. Paris: Institut national des langues et civilisations orientales, 1985. 
 Boxhall, Peter. "Arabian Seafarers in the Indian Ocean," Asian Affairs [London], 20, 1989, pp. 287-95.
 Carver, Richard. "Called to Account: How African Governments Investigate Human Right Violations," African Affairs [London], No. 89, July 1990, pp. 391-415. 
 Charpantier, Jean. "Le pouvoir d'Ali Soilih Ngazidja, 1975- 1978," L'Afrique et l’Asie moderne [Paris], No. 157, 1988, pp. 70- 89. 
 Charpantier, Jean. "Le regime d'Ali Soilih Moroni, 1975-1978: Analyse structurelle (premiere partie)," Le mois en Afrique: Etudes politiques, économiques, et sociologiques africaines [Paris] Nos. 219-220, 1984, pp. 32-50. 
 Charpantier, Jean. "Le regime d'Ali Soilih Moroni, 1975-1978: Analyse structurelle (deuxième partie)," Le mois en Afrique: Etudes politiques, économiques, et sociologiques africaines [Paris] Nos. 221-222, 1984, pp. 3-22. 
 Charpantier, Jean. "Le regime d'Ali Soilih Moroni, 1975-1978: Analyse structurelle (troisième partie)," Le mois en Afrique: Etudes politiques, économiques et sociologiques africaines [Paris], Nos. 223-224, 1984, pp. 29-47. 
 Church, R.J. Harrison. "The Comoros." pp. 277-88 in Africa South of the Sahara, 1994. (23d ed.) London: Europa, 1993. 
 Contes et mythes de Madagascar et des Comores. Paris: Institut national des langues et civilisations orientales, 1987. Culture des lies et développement. Paris: UNESCO, 1991. 
 Damir, Ben Ali. Traditions d'une ligne royale des Comores. Paris: Harmattan, 1985. 
 Davis, Bruce E. "Quality of Life in Small Island Nations in the Indian Ocean," Human Ecology, 14, No. 4, 1986, 453-71. 
 Decracne, Philippe. "L’archipel des Comores face a la montée des perils," L'Afrique et I'Asie moderne [Paris], No. 159, 1988, pp. 52-61, 89. 
 Documents comoriens (annual). Paris: Institut national des langues et civilisations orientales, 1982-93. 
 Education in Sub-Saharan Africa: Policies for Adjustment, Revitalization, and Expansion. Washington: World Bank, 1988. 
 Etudes sur les Comores et I'Islam en I'honneur de Paul Guy. Paris: Institut national des langues et civilisations orientales, 1985. 
 Flobert, Thierry. Les Comores: Evolution juridique et socio-politique. (Travaux et mémoires de la Faculté de Droit et de Science Politique d'Aix-marseilles: Centre d'etudes et de recherches sur les sociétés de l'Ocean Indien, 1976. 
 Gaspart, Claude. "The Comoro Islands since Independence: An Economic Appraisal," Civilizations [Brussels] 29, Nos. 3-4, 1979, pp. 293-311. 
 Griffin, Michael. "The Perfumed Isles," Geographical Magazine [London], No. 58, October 1986, pp. 524-27.Griffin, Michael. "The Politics of Isolation," Africa Report, 33, No. 1, January-February 1988, pp. 52-55.
 Harrison, Selig S., and K. Subrahmanyam (eds.). Superpower Rivalry in the Indian Ocean: Indian and American Perspectives. London: Oxford University Press, 1989.
 Hartley, Aidan. "Paradise Lost," Africa Report, 35, No. 2, March-April 1990, pp. 37-40.
 Martin, B.G. "Arab Migrations to East Africa in Medieval Times," InternationalJournal of African Historical Studies, 7, No. 3, 1974, pp. 367-90.* Martin, Jean. "L'affranchissement des esclaves de Mayotte, decembre 1846-juillet 1847," Cahiers des etudes africaines [Paris] 16, Nos. 1-2, 1976, pp. 207-33.  
 Martin, Jean. "Les debuts du protectorat et la révolte servile de 1891 dans rile d'Anjouan," Revue française d'histoire d'outre-mer [Paris], 60, No. 218, 1973, pp. 45-85. 
 Moines, Jacques. "Ocean Indien et progressisme," L'Afrique et I'Asie moderne [Paris], No. 123, 1979, pp. 3-23. 
 Newitt, Malyn. The Comoro Islands: Struggle Against Dependency in the Indian Ocean. Boulder, Colorado: Westview Press, 1984. 
 Ostheimer, John M. "Political Development in Comoros," African Review [Dar-es-Salaam], 3, No. 3, 2003, pp. 491-506. 
 Terrill, W. Andrew. "The Comoro Islands in South African Regional Strategy," Africa Today, 33, No. 2, 2d/3d quarters 1986, pp. 59-70. 

Comoros–Turkey relations
Turkey
Bilateral relations of Turkey